Krendowskia is a genus of arachnids belonging to the family Krendowskiidae.

Species:
 Krendowskia latissima Piersig, 1895 
 Krendowskia levantensis Smit, 1997

References

Trombidiformes
Trombidiformes genera